Micklethwaite may refer to:

People
Micklethwaite (surname), several people

Places
Micklethwaite, Cumbria, England
Micklethwaite, West Yorkshire a village in Bingley Ward, Bradford, West Yorkshire, England
Micklethwaite, Wetherby, a community in the City of Leeds, England